The Southern Congregational Methodist Church (SCMC) is a Methodist denomination within the Wesleyan-Holiness movement of Christianity. It reported 29 churches located in the Southern United States as of 2007.

Background

The Southern Congregational Methodist Church was formed in 1982. Affiliated churches espouse an Evangelical doctrine and are found largely in rural areas of the American South. The churches emphasize "the basic fundamental doctrines of the historic Christian faith within the framework of traditional Methodism" typical of most Methodist bodies in the Holiness movement "in the John Wesley tradition."

The governmental structure of the church is made up of monthly local church conferences, annual district conferences, and quadrennial general conferences.

Southern Congregational Methodist churches were found in the following U.S. states as of 2007: Alabama, Florida, Georgia, Mississippi, Tennessee, and Texas. The denomination supported two mission groups as of 2007. As of 2015, several Southern Congregational Methodist Churches were found on the roster of the larger Congregational Methodist Church

See also
 Congregational Methodist Church
 Methodism
 Methodist Episcopal Church, South
 Holiness movement

Notes

External links
 Southern Congregational Methodist Church archived website

Southern
Evangelical denominations in North America
Holiness denominations
1982 establishments in the United States